Ivan Yakovlevich Golubev (1841–1918) was a Russian statesman.

Life 
After graduating from the Imperial School of Law, he worked in the Chancellery of the Fourth Department of the Senate (1860–1864) and in the Ministry of Justice (1864–1866), where he participated in the drafting of the judicial reform of Alexander II.

Later, he served in the St. Petersburg District Court, the Senate, and the Ministry of Justice.

He was a member of the State Council (1895) and chairman of the Department for Civil and Ecclesiastical Affairs of the State Council (1905). He became vice-chairman of the State Council after its reorganization in 1906.

He opened the Second, Third, and Fourth State Dumas as the Tsar's representative.

References
Notes

Bibliography
 V.I. Gurko (1939). Features And Figures Of The Past. Government And Opinion In The Reign Of Nicholas II. New York: Russell & Russell.

1841 births
1918 deaths
Lawyers from Saint Petersburg
Imperial School of Jurisprudence alumni
Members of the State Council (Russian Empire)